Calamochrous albipunctalis is a moth in the family Crambidae that is found in Papua New Guinea. It was described by George Hamilton Kenrick in 1907.

It has a wingspan of 44 mm.

References

External links
Images at boldsystems.org

Pyraustinae
Moths described in 1907